Ernophthora is a genus of small moths belonging to the snout moth family (Pyralidae). They form part of the Cabniini, a rather small tribe of the huge snout moth subfamily Phycitinae. This genus is generally found in the Australia-Pacific region.

These moths are remarkable for their ability to colonize oceanic islands. Numerous species occur as far offshore as the Marquesas Islands. Members of this genus can usually be distinguished from relatives by their 10-veined forewings, with veins 4 and 7 completely absent.

Ernophthora caterpillars eat living and sometimes dead leaves, which they also spin together with webbing to hide. The food plants of this genus are not too well known, but appear to be limited by availability rather than being restricted to a particular lineage of plants; recorded are for example Bidens (beggarticks) and Vaccinium (blueberries and relatives), which are both asterids but otherwise unrelated.

Selected species
Species of Ernophthora include:

 Ernophthora aphanoptera Clarke, 1986
 Ernophthora chrysura (Meyrick, 1929) (tentatively placed here)
 Ernophthora denticornis (Meyrick, 1929)
 Ernophthora dryinandra (Meyrick, 1929)
 Ernophthora iospila Clarke, 1986
 Ernophthora lechriogramma Clarke, 1986
 Ernophthora maculicostella (Ragonot, 1888)
 Ernophthora milicha Turner, 1931
 Ernophthora palassoptera Clarke, 1986
 Ernophthora phoenicias Meyrick, 1887
 Ernophthora schematica (Turner, 1947)

Footnotes

References
  (1986): Pyralidae and Microlepidoptera of the Marquesas Archipelago. Smithsonian Contributions to Zoology 416: 1-485. PDF fulltext (214 MB!)
  (2004): Butterflies and Moths of the World, Generic Names and their Type-species – Ernophthora. Version of 5 November 2004. Retrieved 27 May 2011.
  (2009): Markku Savela's Lepidoptera and Some Other Life Forms – Ernophthora. Version of 9 April 2009. Retrieved 27 May 2011.

Cabniini
Pyralidae genera